RRD may refer to

 Rejimen Renjer DiRaja, the Malaysian Army Royal Ranger Regiment
 Reti Radiotelevisive Digitali
 Rolls-Royce Deutschland
 Round-Robin Database
 RR Donnelley, a printing and communications company based in Chicago, Illinois

See also
 RRDtool, Unix / free software "round-robin database"
 RRD Editor, GUI based / free software RRDtool data editor
 SEPTA Regional Rail Division

ru:RRD